The Old Fall River Road, sometimes referred to as "The Old Road" by park staff in Rocky Mountain National Park, was the first automobile road to penetrate the interior of the park. The road linked the east side of the park near Estes Park with Grand Lake on the west side. Work began in 1913 but was interrupted in 1914 by World War I with final work being completed between 1918 and 1920.

The narrow road was partly replaced by Trail Ridge Road in 1932, which incorporated sections of the Fall River Road. The road runs westward from Sheep Lakes to the Alpine Visitor Center. A rockslide closed the road in 1953 and it was not re-opened until 1968 when the National Park Service cleared the rocks and paved the lower third of the route. Both the one-way Old Fall River Road and the paved Trail Ridge Road are maintained and open to motor vehicles from Memorial Day weekend through the first major autumn snowstorm. Both roads are also open to bicycles from April 1 through November 30, but are not patrolled in the pre- and post-season times. Old Fall River Road may be closed for a time to all uses for maintenance.

See also
National Register of Historic Places listings in Larimer County, Colorado

References

External links

Historic American Engineering Record (HAER) documentation, filed under Estes Park, Larimer County, CO:

Road Status Report

National Register of Historic Places in Rocky Mountain National Park
Transportation in Larimer County, Colorado
Roads on the National Register of Historic Places in Colorado
Historic American Engineering Record in Colorado
National Register of Historic Places in Larimer County, Colorado